Bolon is a Manding language of Burkina Faso. There are two dialects, White/Southern and Black/Northern; White Bolon is partially intelligible with Jula.

References

Manding languages
Languages of Burkina Faso